The Battle of Las Taironas was a battle of the Cuban War of Independence that took place on January 17, 1896 at Pinar del Río between Cuban forces led by Major General Antonio Maceo and the Spanish led by lieutenant colonel Ulpiano Sanchez Echevarria who was a Cuban native.

Background
Within the period of the Invasion from East to West in Cuba, Antonio Maceo; After separating from Máximo Gómez in La Habana Province, he continued his march to the westernmost end of the province of Pinar del Río with the aim of reaching the end of the invasion. After a series of defeats, the Spanish command, led by Arsenio Martínez Campos, sought one last action to stop Maceo, an occasion that appeared in the town of Las Taironas.

The Battle
During the course of the battle , the Spanish hosts were repelled, leaving, in a field covered with dead and wounded and the Mambi troops opening the doors for the end of the invasion. The Cuban revolutionaries suffered a major loss during the fighting however as Dr. Federico de la Torre y Latte was killed in action.

Aftermath
The Cuban rebels captured 45 mules from the Spanish. As a result of this failure, which together with the arrival of Maceo to Guane on January 22, 1896, Captain General Martínez Campos was forced to submit his resignation.

References

Conflicts in 1896
Battles involving Spain
Spanish colonial period of Cuba
January 1896 events
Battles involving Cuba